Complicated Animals is an indie band consisting of Brazilian American vocalist and songwriter Mônica da Silva, and musician and producer Chad Alger. The duo perform in their signature, self-coined "indie nova" genre, which mixes indie pop with Brazilian bossa nova.

History

Mônica and Chad released their first album together, “Brasilissima”, under Mônica's name in 2011. The album featured songs in both English and Portuguese, and was produced by Chad Alger, with help from Mônica’s brother, Bruce Driscoll (Blondfire, Avicii, Freedom Fry). The first single, “Aí Então” gained attention from music critics and blogs alike, and caught the ear of Jacob Edgar, owner of  Cumbancha Records and resident world music compiler for Putumayo World Music.  The track was chosen from “tens of thousands of artists”, to be featured on the Putumayo World Music compilation “Brazilian Beat”. Another track from their CD, the upbeat, psychedelic-inspired “That’s Not The Way” was later chosen by the music director of ESPN to be played during the programming of The World Cup in 2014.

Discography

Studio Albums
 In This Game EP (2015, Socialite Fiasco Music)

Singles
 Show Me (2018, Socialite Fiasco Music)
 Times Like These (2020, Socialite Fiasco Music)

TV and film placements
 Phoenix in the Netflix movie The Last Summer (2019, Gulfstream Pictures)

References

External links

Brazilian indie rock groups
American musical duos
American folk rock groups
American indie pop groups
Lo-fi music groups
Brazilian musical duos
Rock music duos
Male–female musical duos